The Chula Vista Police Department serves the city of Chula Vista, California. The department is divided into three divisions: The Administrative Services Division, the Patrol Operations Division, and the Investigations Division. The chief of police is Roxana Kennedy.

The city's police department was threatened with layoffs to help stabilize the department's budget. Although budget cuts saved Chula Vista $18 million, about 100 employees (including 15 police officers) were eliminated.

The department was the first in the country to use drone technology to respond to emergencies.

References

Government of Chula Vista, California
Municipal police departments of California
Organizations based in Chula Vista, California